Daybreak is an upcoming cooperative board game that models the technological and political response to climate change. It is designed by Pandemic creator Matt Leacock and Matteo Menapace, and will be published by CMYK. It has no set release date.

Gameplay 

Throughout the game, the Earth's temperature begins to rise. Simultaneously, players must contend with crisis events, such as droughts, wildfires, rising sea levels, each exacerbated by Earth's rising temperature. Players assume the role of national superpowers or coalitions (the United States, China, Europe, or the Global South), which each have traits to combat the ecological circumstances. For example, the United States has research and development and China has direct economic control. Players divide their investments between carbon emission mitigation and adapting their societies to environmental changes. Based on the game's design, every country needs to contribute or players collectively lose.

Development 

Designer Matt Leacock wanted the game foremost to be fun to play and only secondarily to inform about the effects of climate change without excessive moralizing. The game's title comes from the hopefulness the designers want the game to embody, juxtaposed against the somber circumstances of coping with climate change.

References

Further reading

External links 

 

21st-century board games
Climate change mass media